Saint-Michel  is a neighbourhood in the Montreal borough of
Villeray–Saint-Michel–Parc-Extension. It is named for a colonial-era road in the neighbourhood.

Its boundaries correspond to the former city of  Ville Saint Michel, which was annexed to Montreal in 1968. This formerly independent city was known as Saint-Michel-de-Laval from its inception in 1912 to 1914 and  Ville Saint Michel from 1914 to 1968. This was one of the last cities to be merged into Montreal until the 2002 municipal reorganization.

Saint Michel Boulevard 

Saint-Michel Boulevard in Montreal is a broad north–south thoroughfare in the east of Montreal Island, Quebec, and crosses much of the island. Montreal also has a metro station called Saint-Michel.

History 
It has an ancient origin. Called "Montée Saint-Michel" as early as 1707 and then "Chemin de Saint-Michel" or "Chemin du Sault," it was the main north–south axis of the area, leading north to Côte-Saint-Michel Road (now Crémazie Boulevard) and Sault-au-Récollet. The road was named in honour of Archangel Michael.

The boulevard, officially established in 1938, gave its name to the former municipality (and now district) of Saint-Michel, Montreal.

References

Sources 
 Ville de Montréal, Les rues de Montréal, Répertoire historique, Montréal, Méridien, 1995, p. 377

See also 

 History of Montreal

External links 
 Ville Saint-Michel
 The Journal de St-Michel, a local weekly paper that serves the district
 

Streets in Montreal
Former municipalities in Quebec
Neighbourhoods in Montreal
Villeray–Saint-Michel–Parc-Extension